Järve Centre is a shopping centre in southern Tallinn, Estonia. Järve Centre is the biggest shopping centre selling furnishing goods in Estonia, with a gross leasable area of 43,000 square metres containing nearly 111 different shops (including 9 restaurants and cafés). Despite the name of Järve, the centre is located in Nõmme district's Rahumäe subdistrict. The shopping centre has three floors. The biggest shops in the centre are Selver, Aatrium, Tööriistamarket, Sportland, and Diivaniparadiis.

Järve Centre opened its doors in 2002. In addition to furnishing goods, Järve Centre offers a large selection of leisure and sporting goods, footwear and clothing, children's goods and different services.

External links

Buildings and structures in Tallinn
Shopping centres in Estonia
Shopping malls established in 2002
2002 establishments in Estonia
Tourist attractions in Tallinn